The 2020 Northern NSW Football season is the seventh season under the new competition format in northern New South Wales. 

All NPL and grassroots competitions were suspended for one month due to the impacts from the COVID-19 pandemic in Australia, effective 18 March to 14 April, and further extended until early July. The NPL season commenced on 12 July.

League tables

2020 Northern NSW National Premier Leagues

The revised competition comprised a single round-robin, followed by a seeded draw to determine opponents in the final five rounds, followed by a five-team finals series. The NPL Premier normally qualifies for the national NPL finals series, but the 2020 National Premier Leagues finals series was cancelled in July.

League Table

Results

Finals

2020 NEWFM Northern League One

League Table

Finals

Cup Competitions

FFA Cup Preliminary Rounds

Northern NSW soccer clubs commenced the 2020 FFA Cup preliminary rounds in February, only to see it suspended due to the impacts from the pandemic. At the time of suspension, only the first two rounds had been played, involving teams mostly from the Northern regions. The competition was cancelled on 3 July.

References

2020 in Australian soccer
Football Northern NSW season, 2020